The 20th Armored Division was an armored division of the United States Army that fought in World War II. It was activated on 15 March 1943 at Camp Campbell in Kentucky. 

The division had no official name although it did associate itself with the nickname "Armoraiders" while in training at Camp Campbell.  After certification as a liberating division by the US Army Center of Military History on 28 October 1988, and the awarding of a Liberation Certificate by the United States Holocaust Memorial Council, veterans of the division adopted the name Liberators."

 Composition 
The division comprised the following units:

 Headquarters Company
 Combat Command A
 Combat Command B
 Reserve Command
 9th Tank Battalion
 20th Tank Battalion
 27th Tank Battalion
 8th Armored Infantry Battalion
 65th Armored Infantry Battalion
 70th Armored Infantry Battalion
 33rd Cavalry Reconnaissance Squadron (Mechanized)
 220th Armored Engineer Battalion
 160th Armored Signal Company
 20th Armored Division Artillery
 412th Armored Field Artillery Battalion
 413th Armored Field Artillery Battalion
 414th Armored Field Artillery Battalion
 20th Armored Division Trains
 138th Armored Ordnance Maintenance Battalion
 220th Armored Medical Battalion
 Military Police Platoon
 Band

History

The 20th Armored Division departed Boston on 6 February and arrived at Le Havre, France, 19 February 1945. On arrival it was sent to Buchy for a month's assembly, preparation, and additional training. It then moved through Belgium to Langendernbach, Germany, 10 April. After considering breaking up the new division to provide replacements for the veteran armored divisions under his 12th U.S. Army Group, General Omar N. Bradley, sent the unit to Marktbreit, where the Division was attached to the III Corps; 20 April. Three days later, it was detached and reassigned to the XV Corps, Seventh Army, at Würzburg, Germany.

The condition of the Division when it arrived overseas was affected by a recent change in its primary mission.  Until October 1944, the 20th Armored Division's mission was to train soldiers and qualify them for overseas shipment as combat replacements for armored units.  To perform this mission, the Division included in its strength an unusually large number of intelligent and highly trained men, including students from several of the Army's advanced college training programs.

Combat chronicle
The actual arrival of the 20th Armored Division into combat occurred 4–9 April 1945.  The division's armored field artillery battalions (the 412th, 413th, and 414th), with elements of the 33rd Cavalry Reconnaissance Squadron, moved up to the west bank of the Rhine River to support the 101st Airborne Division near Delhoven, Germany, and the 82nd Airborne Division across the river from Hitdorf, Germany. It was the 412th that supported the 82nd in their attack on Hitdorf that resulted in the awarding of a Distinguished Unit Citation.

Overlooking the above, incomplete official records minimize the Division's perceived combat activity, i.e., citing: Elements of the division first saw action as Task Force Campbell when a false surrender by the enemy resulted in fighting in the town of Dorf, 25 April.

At that time, the Division assembled near Deiningen and reconnoitered for routes to the Danube River.
The 20th Armored Division's 27th Tank Battalion (a component of Combat Command R) was attached to the veteran 42nd Infantry Division on 23 April 1945 and led the attack to capture the town of Donauwörth on the 25th to secure the crossing of the Danube. The river was crossed on 28 April, the 20th meeting sporadic resistance.  The success of the operation prompted Lt. Col. Donald E. Downard, commanding officer of the 2nd Battalion, 222nd Infantry (42nd Infantry Division) who had witnessed more than 25 months of combat, to state: "I have never seen a more aggressive armored unit." Subsequently, elements of the 20th seized the bridge over the Paar River at Schrobenhausen, and secured crossings over the Ilm River.

Elements of the 20th Armored Division, along with those of the U.S. Seventh Army's 45th (Thunderbird) and 42nd (Rainbow) Infantry Divisions, participated in the liberation of Dachau concentration camp on 29 April 1945. While anecdotal reports indicate varied 20th AD troops took part in the unfolding process of discovery and liberation of the camp, ultimately it was the above attachment of elements of the 27th Tank Battalion to those of the 42nd Infantry Division on which the 20th Armored would be jointly recognized by the US Army Center for Military History (CMH) and the United States Holocaust Memorial Museum (USHMM) as an official Liberating unit.  The Division and its flag were subsequently added to USHMM displays and were cited online there and elsewhere.

Meanwhile, in support of units of the 45th Infantry Division (primarily belonging to the 180th and 157th Infantry Regiments), elements of the 20th Armored Division's Combat Command B (including certain forces of the 20th Tank Battalion, 65th Armored Infantry Battalion, and 413th Armored Field Artillery Battalion), operating together as Task Force 20, were awarded a Distinguished Unit Citation for their collective action in the Central European (Southern Germany) Campaign.  The Recommendation for Unit Citation, dated 3 October 1945, states:These units, which constituted Task Force 20, are cited for outstanding performance of duty in action during the period 28–30 April 1945, in the vicinity of Neuherberg, Germany.  With soldierly courage and irrepressible determination members of Task Force 20 pushed an armored spearhead 45 miles beyond the Danube River to the outskirts of Munich, destroying a supply train, capturing almost 800 prisoners, and securing four bridges over the Amper River intact.  Continuing the attack on 29–30 April against an enemy entrenched in elaborately prepared dugouts and behind the thick walls of the SS Training Center and an Anti-tank School which were defended by small arms, machine guns, hundreds of panzerfausts and twelve 88 mm guns, our troops killed 700 SS Troops, who fought stubbornly and fanatically.  This victory destroyed the defenses of Munich, Germany, removing resistance to the entry of troops into the City.The 27th Tank Battalion remained attached to the 42nd Infantry Division during its attack on Munich, 29–30 April. Despite its recent efficacy in the combat zone, the rest of the 20th was ordered off the roads leading into Munich on 28 April, allowing the veteran 42nd (Rainbow) and 45th (Thunderbird) Infantry Divisions to capture Munich proper.

In pursuit of retreating German troops and prevention of a feared German National Redoubt in the Austrian Alps, elements of the 20th Armored (primarily of Combat Command A) crossed the Inn River at Wasserburg on 3 May, entered Traunstein on 4 May, and had entered Salzburg when it received word that hostilities would cease in Europe.

Following V-E Day, the Division performed Occupation duties, returning to the U.S. in August 1945, slated for participation in the then-planned invasion of Japan.  The Division reported to Camp Cooke, CA, for amphibious assault training, but after the atomic bombs were dropped and Japan surrendered, the unit was inactivated on 2 April 1946 at Camp Hood in Texas.

Officially, the Division is erroneously credited with only eight days in combat (overlooking the previously described Rhine action)Peanuts'' creator, Charles Schulz, rose to the rank of Staff Sergeant (and Light Machine Gun Squad Leader) while a member of the Division's 8th Armored Infantry Battalion. While Schulz's unit was nearby, it did not actually enter Dachau.
Richard Nixon's future Vice President, Spiro Agnew, attained the rank of 1st Lieutenant while with the 20th Armored Division's 480th Armored Infantry Regiment (prior to reorganization to light armored division TO&E).

Casualties
Total battle casualties: 186
Killed in action: 46
Wounded in action: 134
Missing in action: 1
Prisoners of war: 5

Notes

References

20th Armored Division, U.S.
Armored Division, U.S. 20th
Military units and formations established in 1943
Military units and formations disestablished in 1946